Thorgils, Torgils, Þorgils, Torgil or Thorgil is a Nordic masculine given name that may refer to
Þorgils gjallandi (1851–1915), Icelandic author  
Þorgils Mathiesen (born 1962), Icelandic handball player 
Thorgils Skarthi, 10th century Viking leader and poet 
Thorgil Sprakling, 10th century Danish chieftain 
Torgils Orrabeinfostre, legendary Norse hero
Torgils Lovra, Norwegian editor
Torgil Øwre Gjertsen, Norwegian football player
Torgil Thorén (1892–1982), Swedish military officer
Torgil von Seth (1895–1989), Swedish politician
Torgils Knutsson (?–1306), Swedish nobleman